Lissospira bushae is a species of sea snail, a marine gastropod mollusk in the family Skeneidae,

Description
The size of the shell attains 3.3 mm.

Distribution
This species occurs in the Atlantic Ocean off Georgia, USA, at a depth of 538 m.

References

 Dall, W. H. 1927. Small shells from dredgings off the southeast coast of the United States by the United States Fisheries Steamer 'Albatross' in 1885 and 1886. Proceedings of the United States National Museum 70(2667): 1-134

External links
 To Encyclopedia of Life
 To USNM Invertebrate Zoology Mollusca Collection
 To World Register of Marine Species

bushae
Gastropods described in 1927